Robert Norman Munsch   (born June 11, 1945) is an American-Canadian children's author.

Personal life and career
Robert Munsch was born in Pittsburgh, Pennsylvania, on June 11, 1945. He grew up in a family of 9 children. He graduated from Fordham University in 1969 with a Bachelor of Arts degree in history and from Boston University in 1971 with a Master of Arts degree in anthropology.

He studied to become a Jesuit priest, but decided he would rather work with children after having jobs at orphanages and daycare centres. In 1973, he received a Master of Education in Child Studies from Tufts University. In 1975, he moved to Canada to work at the preschool at the University of Guelph in Guelph, Ontario. He also taught in the College of Family and Consumer Studies at the University of Guelph as a lecturer and as an assistant professor. In Guelph, he was encouraged to publish the many stories he made up for the children he worked with.

One of Munsch's best-known books, Love You Forever, was listed fourth on the 2001 Publishers Weekly All-Time Bestselling Children's Books list for paperbacks at 6.97 million copies (not including the 1.049 million hardcover copies). It has since sold more than 30 million copies and has been featured on the episode "The One With the Cake" from the television show Friends, as well as being mentioned by Oprah Winfrey on Late Night with David Letterman as being her favorite children's book. His other famous book The Paper Bag Princess has sold more than seven million copies and is considered to be a feminist story, as well as a literary classic.

Munsch and his wife Ann discovered they couldn't have biological children after two pregnancies ended with still-birth. They have three children via adoption.

Health
Munsch has publicly talked about his bipolar disorder and addiction issues. In August 2008, Munsch suffered a stroke that affected his memory. He has since retired; however, he continues to publish two previously written books each year. On May 15, 2010, Munsch revealed that he has been diagnosed with obsessive-compulsive and manic-depressive disorder, and that he had a cocaine addiction that started in 2005 and was a recovering alcoholic; at the time, he had been clean for four months, and had regularly attended Alcoholics Anonymous for the previous 25 years and Narcotics Anonymous meetings more recently. On October 2, 2021, Munsch revealed to the CBC that he had been diagnosed with dementia and, as a result, can no longer write.

Writing style
Munsch is known for his exuberant storytelling methods, with exaggerated expressions and acted voices. He makes up his stories in front of audiences and refines them through repeated tellings.

His stories do not have a recurring single character; instead, the characters are based on the children to whom he first told the story, including his own children. He often performed at children's festivals and appears at elementary schools, sometimes unannounced. In 1991, some of his books were adapted into the cartoon series A Bunch of Munsch.

Awards and honours
In 1985, Munsch won a Juno Award for his portrayal of "Murmel, Murmel, Munsch: More Outrageous Stories". In 1992, he was also chosen "Author of the Year" by the Canadian Booksellers' Association.
In 1999, Munsch was made a Member of the Order of Canada. On June 17, 2009, it was announced that Munsch would receive a star on Canada's Walk of Fame in Toronto. The induction ceremony was held on September 12, 2009, and in 2013, his star was revealed on King Street in Toronto.
In 2009, Robert Munsch Public School opened in Whitby, Ontario, and in 2014, a second Robert Munsch Public School opened in Mount Albert, Ontario.

He is also the most stolen author at the Toronto Public Library.

Publications

Compilations

References

External links
 
 
 Video interview at AuthorViews
 Robert Munsch  at publisher Annick Press
 

1945 births
Living people
20th-century Canadian male writers
21st-century Canadian male writers
American emigrants to Canada
American expatriate writers in Canada
Boston University College of Arts and Sciences alumni
Canadian children's writers
Canadian Roman Catholics
Fordham University alumni
Former Jesuits
Juno Award for Children's Album of the Year winners
Members of the Order of Canada
People with bipolar disorder
Tufts University faculty
Academic staff of the University of Guelph
Writers from Pittsburgh